Iruvar Ullam is a 2021 Indian Tamil-language family drama film directed by G. Ramesh and starring Vinay Rai, Payal Rajput and Archanna Guptaa. Having been shot in 2013, it was released on streaming platforms during September 2021.

Plot
The film narrates the tale of an IT professional settled in US, who is married to an Indian girl. After marriage, the pair live a happy life but things change when his ex-fiancé reappears.

Cast 

Vinay Rai as Karthik Natarajan
Payal Rajput as Parvathy
Archanna Guptaa as Sambhavi
Jayaprakash
Sathyan
M. S. Bhaskar as Karthik's uncle
VTV Ganesh as Kuralarasan (Mams)
Meera Krishnan as Karthik's mother
Rishi as Suresh
Singapore Durairaj as Durairaj
Sriram as Seetharam Kesari
Uma as Sambhavi's mother
Subhalekha Sudhakar as Sambhavi's father
Rajyalakshmi
Singamuthu
Senthi Kumari
Ravi Prakash

Production 
The film was shot in 2012, with Vinay Rai working on the film alongside his commitments for Aranmanai (2014), Serndhu Polama (2015) and Aayirathil Iruvar (2017). Bindu Madhavi signed the project during June 2012 and was set to portray a NRI girl based in the US, but later dropped out of the project. Aindrita Ray was also approached but subsequently actresses Payal Rajput and Archanna Guptaa were cast in their first Tamil film through the project. The film, produced by L. Sivabalan of Zero Rules Entertainment, had music composed by Vijay Antony, and was shot in India and the US.

Despite completing production in 2013, the film remained unreleased. Ramesh later worked on two more films - Kallattam (2016) and Adavi (2020) - which released before Iruvar Ullam.

Soundtrack
The soundtrack, composed by Vijay Antony, was released in July 2013.

Release 
Following several years of delays, the film was released on Amazon Prime outside India on 16 September 2021.

References

External links  
 

2021 films
2020s Tamil-language films
Indian drama films
Films scored by Vijay Antony
2021 drama films